Janusz Roman Olech (born 4 April 1965) is a Polish fencer. He won a silver medal in the individual sabre event at the 1988 Summer Olympics.

References

1965 births
Living people
Polish male fencers
Olympic fencers of Poland
Fencers at the 1988 Summer Olympics
Fencers at the 1992 Summer Olympics
Fencers at the 1996 Summer Olympics
Olympic silver medalists for Poland
Olympic medalists in fencing
Fencers from Warsaw
Medalists at the 1988 Summer Olympics
20th-century Polish people
21st-century Polish people